Zhu Jiaqi (born 1 June 1993) is a Chinese footballer currently playing as a goalkeeper for Chinese Club Baoding Xuecheng Athletic.

Career statistics

Club
.

Notes

References

1993 births
Living people
Chinese footballers
Association football goalkeepers
China League Two players
China League One players
Shenyang Zhongze F.C. players
Shenzhen Fengpeng F.C. players
Cangzhou Mighty Lions F.C. players
Yinchuan Helanshan F.C. players
Jiangxi Beidamen F.C. players